The Harley-Davidson Model 7D of 1911 was the first successful v-twin from Harley-Davidson, inaugurating a motorcycle engine configuration that has continued unbroken from the Milwaukee motor company ever since.

In 1909, Harley had made a few examples (27 units) of another v-twin, but the design was flawed and they did not try again until two years later.  In 1911, 5,625 Model 7Ds were manufactured.  The Model 7D's motor was the F-head IOE engine, in use until 1929.  It sold for US$300, which with inflation would be $ in today's currency.

Ignition was via a magneto, and the engine was started using bicycle-style pedals. Instead of a conventional clutch, a pulley belt tensioner could be moved, allowing the leather drive belt to slip.  Touting its effective muffler, Harley-Davidson advertised the 7D, and the other Harleys of this era, as "The Silent Gray Fellow." The latter moniker was also in reference to William S. Harley, who was known for his quiet personality. A 1911 Model 7D from the George Pardo collection was set to be auctioned in January 2014.

See also

List of Harley-Davidson motorcycles
List of motorcycles of the 1910s
Thor Model U
Sears Dreadnought
FN Four

Notes

References

 
 
 

7D
Motorcycles introduced in the 1910s